Lerrone Richards (born 25 August 1992) is a British professional boxer who has held the IBO super-middleweight title since 2021. At regional level he held the British, Commonwealth and European super-middleweight titles between 2019 and 2021.

Amateur career
As an amateur Richards compiled a record of 91–9. He represented Ghana at the 2012 African Olympic Qualifier, losing in the quarter-final to Abdelmalek Rahou by 9:16.

Professional career
Richards made his professional debut on 29 September 2013, scoring a four-round points decision (PTS) victory over Robert Studzinski at the York Hall in London.

With four wins out of four fights under his belt, Richards had a two-year absence from competitive bouts while waiting for his contract to expire with his current management team due to a dispute; his last fight being a PTS win over Darren McKenna in April 2014. In 2016, with his contract now expired, Richards signed a promotional deal with Frank Warren's Queensberry Promotions. His return to the ring came on 24 October of that year, winning with a first-round technical knockout (TKO) against Gordan Glisic.

He fought and won five times in 2017, ending the year with a fight against Rhys Pagan for the vacant WBO European super-middleweight title on 27 November at the Grange St. Paul's Hotel in London. Richards won the fight via ten-round unanimous decision (UD), with two judges scoring the bout 99–91 and the third scoring it 98–92.

Following a six-round PTS victory over Chris Dutton in March 2018 – Richards' only fight of 2018 due to injury – he fought Tommy Langford on 27 April 2019 at the Wembley Arena, London, with the vacant WBO International, and Commonwealth super-middleweight titles on the line. Richards won by UD with the three judges scoring the bout 118–111, 118–110 and 116–113.

The first defence of his Commonwealth title came against Lennox Clarke on 30 November 2019 at Arena Birmingham, with the vacant British title also up for grabs. Richards retained his title via split decision (SD), adding the British title to his collection. Two judges scored in favour of Richards with 117–112 and 116–113 while the third scored it 115–113 to Clarke.

Professional boxing record

References

External links

Living people
1992 births
Boxers from Greater London
English male boxers
Super-middleweight boxers
English people of Ghanaian descent
Black British sportspeople
British Boxing Board of Control champions
Commonwealth Boxing Council champions
European Boxing Union champions
International Boxing Organization champions